Daniel Quinn (August 19, 1956 – July 4, 2015) was an American actor from Milwaukee, Wisconsin.

Career 
Quinn moved to New York City at age 19, where he worked in theater and ballet before breaking into television and film.  On television, he has appeared in the soap opera The Young and the Restless, police series Hunter, and independent drama twentysixmiles. He starred in the science fiction films Scanner Cop and Scanners: The Showdown.

Death
Daniel died of a heart attack on July 4, 2015, at the age of 58.

Filmography

Film

Television

References

External links 
 
 

1956 births
2015 deaths
Place of death missing
American male film actors
American male television actors
Male actors from Milwaukee